The Financial Conduct Authority (FCA) is a financial regulatory body in the United Kingdom, but operates independently of the UK Government and is financed by charging fees to members of the financial services industry. The FCA regulates financial firms providing services to consumers and maintains the integrity of the financial markets in the United Kingdom.

It focuses on the regulation of conduct by both retail and wholesale financial services firms. Like its predecessor the FSA, the FCA is structured as a company limited by guarantee.

The FCA works alongside the Prudential Regulation Authority and the Financial Policy Committee to set regulatory requirements for the financial sector. The FCA is responsible for the conduct of around 58,000 businesses which employ 2.2 million people and contribute around £65.6 billion in annual tax revenue to the economy in the United Kingdom.

History
On 19 December 2012, the Financial Services Act 2012 received royal assent,  and it came into force on 1 April 2013. The Act created a new regulatory framework for financial services and abolished the Financial Services Authority. Specifically, the Act gave the Bank of England responsibility for financial stability, bringing together macro and micro prudential regulation, and created a new regulatory structure consisting of the Bank of England's Financial Policy Committee, the Prudential Regulation Authority and the Financial Conduct Authority.

In March 2020, the FCA introduced strong customer authentication rules aiming to reduce fraud and improve security by requiring European banks to provide three layers of authentication when customers made online payments over €30 in Europe:

 PIN code or a password
 Biometrics such as a fingerprint
 Physical device such as a phone.

Payment Systems Regulator
In April 2015, the FCA created a separate entity, the Payment Systems Regulator (PSR), in accordance with section 40 of the Financial Services (Banking Reform) Act 2013. The PSR's role is "to promote competition and innovation in payment systems, and ensure they work in the interests of the organisations and people that use them".

Anti-money laundering supervision 
The Office for Professional Body Anti-Money Laundering Supervision (OPBAS) is based within the FCA. It was established in January 2018 to oversee the 22 accountancy and legal professional bodies which supervise anti-money laundering compliance in view of the Money Laundering Act 2017.

Powers
The authority has significant powers, including the power to regulate conduct related to the marketing of financial products. It is able to specify minimum standards and to place requirements on products. It has the power to investigate organisations and individuals. In addition, the FCA is able to ban financial products for up to a year while considering an indefinite ban; it has the power to instruct firms to immediately retract or modify promotions which it finds to be misleading and to publish such decisions.

Further, the FCA is able to freeze assets of individuals or organisations under investigation whether or not they are innocent or guilty. The authority has been responsible for regulating the consumer credit industry since 1 April 2014, taking over the role from the Office of Fair Trading.

Research in 2021 published by the FCA suggested such warnings to consumers went unheard, or ignored. Fewer than one in 10 potential cryptocurrency buyers were aware of consumer warnings on the FCA website, although 88% of crypto users were aware that these holdings were not protected by statutory compensation.

Sectors and firms

Banks 
The Financial Services Act of 2012 set out a new system for regulating financial services in order to protect and improve the UK's economy.

The FCA will supervise banks to ensure they treat customers fairly, encourage innovation and healthy competition, and help the FCA to identify potential risks early so they can take action to reduce the risks.

Mutual societies 
There are more than 10,000 mutual societies in the United Kingdom. The FCA are responsible for registering new mutual societies, keeping public records, and receiving annual returns.

Financial advisers 
Beginning December 31, 2012, independent financial advisers (IFAs) are legally obliged to follow Retail Distribution Review (RDR) rules. In order to be classed as an IFA, a business must offer a broad range of retail investment products and give consumers unbiased and unrestricted advice based on comprehensive and fair market analysis.

Leadership

Chief executive 
In February 2011, it was confirmed that the new head of the FCA would be Martin Wheatley, formerly chairman of Hong Kong's Securities and Futures Commission. However, Wheatley's appointment was not put in front of the Treasury Select Committee for a pre-appointment hearing. Instead, the Government stated it would put Wheatley and future chief executives forward for a pre-commencement hearing, i.e. after they had been formally appointed but before they began the role.

In July 2015, Wheatley resigned his post at the FCA following a vote of no confidence by George Osborne. In September 2015, Tracey McDermott took over from Wheatley as acting chief executive.

Andrew Bailey was appointed chief executive on 26 January 2016. After Bailey moved to become the Governor of the Bank of England, it was announced that Christopher Woolard would become the Interim Chief Executive. In June 2020, it was announced that Woolard would be succeeded on a permanent basis by Nikhil Rathi.

List of chief executives

Chairperson 
In June 2012, it was confirmed that John Griffith-Jones would become the non executive chair of the FCA once the FSA ceases operations in 2013. Griffith-Jones joined the FSA board in September 2012, as a non executive director and deputy chair.

Charles Randell became chair of the FCA and PSR in April 2018. In October 2021, he resigned from this position and is scheduled to leave the post in Spring 2022.

On February 7, 2022, Richard Lloyd was named to begin serving as interim FCA chair from June 2022.

List of chairmen

Criticism
In June 2013, the Financial Conduct Authority was criticised by the Parliamentary Commission on Banking Standards in their report "Changing Banking for Good", which stated:

The FCA was rebuked by the Treasury Select Committee for lack of concern over the increase in mortgage interest rates of the Bank of Ireland's subsidiary of the United Kingdom.

There had been calls for the resignation of chairman John Griffith-Jones because of his responsibility for auditing HBOS as chairman of KPMG at the time of the financial crisis of 2007–08. There has also been criticism of Chief Executive Martin Wheatley because of his responsibility for the minibond fiasco in Hong Kong.

On 10 December 2014, the FCA released a report from Simon Davis from Clifford Chance LLP inquiring into the events of 27/28 March 2014 relating to the press briefing of information in the FCA's 2014/15 Business Plan.

The report recommended:

 That there be substantial improvement in the procedures relating to the identification, control and release of price-sensitive information,
 That the final version of the FCA's Business Plan should only be made available publicly to all market participants at the same time,
 That the relevant review team address the issue of price-sensitive information in any assessment of a potential thematic review, and
 That the FCA urgently put in place price and volume monitoring procedures, combined with an action plan for the effective management of the FCA's reaction to any issues involving the uncontrolled release of price-sensitive information originating from or involving the FCA.

On 16 December 2014, the Treasury select committee commenced taking evidence on the press briefing. Shortly thereafter, committee chair Andrew Tyrie said it looked as if the FCA had been guilty of an "extraordinary blunder" and had created a "disorderly market" through its actions.

See also

 FCA Controlled Functions
 Financial Policy Committee
 Financial Services Authority
 Prudential Regulation Authority
 Fraud Advisory Panel

References

External links
 

Financial Conduct Authority people
Financial regulatory authorities of the United Kingdom
Financial services companies established in 2013
Government agencies established in 2013
HM Treasury
Organisations based in the London Borough of Newham
Private companies limited by guarantee of the United Kingdom
2013 establishments in the United Kingdom
Stratford, London
United Kingdom banking law